C-Sides is an indie pop EP by Chris Garneau. It was released on November 26, 2007, on the Absolutely Kosher record label.

Track listing
 "Love Zombies" – 1:40
 "Blackout" – 4:56
 "Runt" – 4:14
 "Christmas Song" – 2:07
 "Island Song" – 3:12

External links
Chris Garneau's official website

2007 EPs
Chris Garneau albums
Absolutely Kosher Records EPs